The Men's Giant Slalom competition of the Vancouver 2010 Paralympics is held at Whistler Blackcomb in Whistler, British Columbia. The competition is scheduled for Tuesday, March 16 and Wednesday March 17.

Visually impaired 
In the downhill visually impaired, the athlete with a visual impairment has a sighted guide. The two skiers are considered a team, and dual medals are awarded.

Sitting

Standing

See also
Alpine skiing at the 2010 Winter Olympics – Men's downhill

References

External links
2010 Winter Plympics schedule and results, at the official website of the 2010 Winter Paralympics in Vancouver

Men's giant slalom
Winter Paralympics